Since the 1960s, the Marvel Comics superhero the Hulk has appeared in many types of various media other than the comics, such as animated and live-action TV series, films, books, video games, comic strips, and stage shows.

Television

Animation
1960s

Hulk debuted in television in 1966 as part of The Marvel Super Heroes animated series. It was produced by Grantray-Lawrence Animation, which was headed by Grant Simmons, Ray Patterson and Robert Lawrence. The series is in stop-motion comic book form, with radio personalities Max Ferguson voicing the Hulk and Paul Soles voicing Bruce Banner, also voicing Rick Jones. The 39 seven-minute segment episodes were shown along with those featuring other characters from the series, including Captain America, Iron Man, Thor, and Sub-Mariner. They were all based on the early stories from The Incredible Hulk and Tales to Astonish comic book series from Marvel. The series shows Bruce Banner's origin of becoming the Hulk and struggling to keep his dual identity a secret from everyone, as well as trying to maintain his romance with Betty Ross, friendship with Rick Jones—the only one knowing that Banner and the Hulk are the same—and battling super-villains such as the Leader, Metal Master, Ringmaster, Chameleon, Boomerang & Tyrannus. At the same time, he must avoid capture by the military headed by Betty's father General Thunderbolt Ross with his right-hand man Glenn Talbot.

1980s
Hulk returned to television with the animated series, The Incredible Hulk (1982–1983) which aired in a combined hour with Spider-Man and His Amazing Friends. The series once again shows Bruce Banner transformed into Hulk by accident and struggling to keep it a secret from Betty Ross, and everyone else around him. Rick Jones is the one who shares his secret and helps control it while Bruce uses his new powers to battle supervillains such as the Leader, Spymaster, Doctor Octopus, Hydra and the Puppet Master; while fighting the military at the same time lead by Betty's father General Thunderbolt Ross with Major Glenn Talbot whose first name had been changed to "Ned". This series featured the first animated appearance of Bruce's cousin Jennifer who becomes She-Hulk. Bruce was voiced by Michael Bell, while Hulk was voiced by Bob Holt, the narrator was voiced by Hulk co-creator Stan Lee himself, and Betty Ross was voiced by B.J. Ward.
Hulk also appears in the Spider-Man and His Amazing Friends episode "Spidey Goes Hollywood", with Peter Cullen voicing both Hulk and Bruce Banner.

1990s
The Marvel Action Hour (1994–1996): Hulk appears in episodes of the Fantastic Four and Iron Man cartoons that made up The Marvel Action Hour, although the character design for both Banner and the Hulk were markedly different, with Ron Perlman playing both roles.
X-Men: Hulk appears as a robot in the Danger Room of the X-Mansion in the episode "The Juggernaut Returns" (1995) on this episode Hulk appears on the desert fighting Juggernaut.
The Incredible Hulk (1996–1997): Marvel Studios and Saban Entertainment brought Hulk back to animated form, with Neal McDonough voicing Dr. Bruce Banner, Lou Ferrigno reprising the role of Hulk 1978-1982 live-action TV series, and Michael Donovan voicing Grey Hulk. In 1997, the title changed to The Incredible Hulk and She-Hulk, when She-Hulk was given full-time status; featuring She-Hulk in episodes with Gray Hulk. In the episode "Mind Over Anti-Matter", Bruce turns into a monstrous Dark Hulk when possessed by an evil entity, both voiced by Kevin Michael Richardson. The show had all the elements from the comics, from his origin to Bruce's turmoil with being Hulk and his romance with Betty Ross as well as his friendship with Rick Jones (voiced by Luke Perry) who followed Hulk around to help and look out for him while Hulk/Bruce was being hunted by the military lead by Betty's father General Thunderbolt Ross with Glenn Talbot. The series also had Doc Samson who helped out Hulk, while at the same time battling him. The series featured Hulk facing off against his archenemy the Leader with his Gamma mutated army including Abomination, Gargoyle, Ogress, and the Gamma Warriors; Hulk also dealt with other villains like Zzzax, Absorbing Man and Doctor Doom, and an unnamed evil being who's loosely based on Shanzar that once turned Hulk into Dark Hulk. The show aired briefly on ABC Family following the release of the live-action movie in 2003.
In Avengers: United They Stand, a painting of Hulk is seen along with other former Avengers.

2000s
Fantastic Four: World's Greatest Heroes: The Hulk appears in the episode titled "Hard Knocks" (2006), with Andrew Kavadas voicing Bruce Banner and Mark Gibbon voicing Hulk.
Wolverine and the X-Men: The Hulk appears in the episode "Wolverine Vs. the Hulk" (2008), with Gabriel Mann voicing Bruce Banner and Fred Tatasciore voicing Hulk.
Iron Man: Armored Adventures: Appears in the episode "Uncontrollable" (2010), with Mark Gibbon reprising his role of the Hulk. During the season 2 episode, "Rage of the Hulk" the Hulk returns, however, first as Bruce Banner (his voice actor was uncredited), an old friend of Howard Stark's. He enlisted both Howard and Tony's help in curing his condition as Hulk was by creating a gamma energy syphon, only to be interrupted by the arrival of General Ross. After exposer to Ross's modified syphon, Hulk turns into Grey Hulk. Bruce returns along with several other of Iron Man's allies in the finale "Makulan Invasion Part 2: Unite" helping Iron Man. Unlike any other incarnation of Hulk, Bruce doesn't grow to become Hulk and rip off his clothing. Instead, he just transforms in a flash of light. 
Hulk appears in The Super Hero Squad Show (2009–11), voiced by Travis Willingham who also voiced his Grey Hulk form in one episode.

2010s
The Avengers: Earth's Mightiest Heroes (2010–12): A show titled Hulk: Gamma Corps was originally being scripted in 2008 but Marvel Animation chose to fold that show into The Avengers: Earth's Mightiest Heroes, with Gabriel Mann voicing Bruce Banner and Fred Tatasciore voicing Hulk. He was imprisoned in the Cube in his first appearance "Hulk Versus the World", but escaped during "Breakout, Part 1" with Leonard Samson after he was affected by gamma radiation. He later joins the Avengers after helping Thor, Iron Man, the Wasp, and Ant-Man fight Graviton. In the next episode, "Some Assembly Required", he is taken over by the Enchantress and leaves because he thinks the Avengers believe he is a monster, but comes back in "Gamma World, Part 2" after helping defeat the Leader. In "Nightmare in Red", he is arrested by the Hulk Busters after being framed for attacking the S.H.I.E.L.D. helicarrier when actually it was Red Hulk, "Thunderbolt" Ross, in disguise. Hulk later helped save the world from being devoured by Galactus.
Ultimate Spider-Man (2012): Appears in the episodes "Exclusive", "Home Sick Hulk" and "The Incredible Spider-Hulk", once again voiced by Fred Tatasciore. During "Return to the Spider-Verse" Part 3, a Marvel Noir version of Mr. Fixit appears as a rival gang leader to Hammerhead.
Avengers Assemble (2013): A main cast member, once again voiced by Fred Tatasciore and Bruce Banner also voiced by Tatasciore in Season 1, Jesse Burch in Season 3, and Kevin Shinick in Season 4.
Hulk and the Agents of S.M.A.S.H. (2013–15): A main cast member, once again with Hulk and Bruce Banner voiced by Fred Tatasciore.
Phineas and Ferb: Mission Marvel: Appears in the 2013 animated special voiced by Fred Tatasciore.
Ultimate Hulk vs. Wolverine: Bruce Banner is voiced by Sebastian Spence, and Hulk is voiced by Michael Dobson.
Lego Marvel Super Heroes: Maximum Overload: Hulk is voiced by Fred Tatasciore again.
Marvel Disk Wars: The Avengers (2014–15): Hulk appeared as a main character in the Toei anime series, voiced in Japanese by Kenichirō Matsuda and in English by Kyle Hebert.
Lego Marvel Super Heroes: Avengers Reassembled: Hulk is voiced again by Fred Tatasciore.
Guardians of the Galaxy (2017): Appears in the episodes "Stayin' Alive" and "Evolution Rock", once again voiced by Fred Tatasciore with Bruce Banner being voiced by Jesse Burch in season two and Kevin Shinick in season three.
Marvel Future Avengers (2017–18): The Madhouse-produced anime features Hulk as a main character, reprised by Kenichirō Matsuda in Japanese and Fred Tatasciore in English.
Spider-Man (2017): Bruce Banner is voiced by Kevin Shinick, and the Hulk is once again voiced by Fred Tatasciore.

2020s
Spidey and His Amazing Friends (2021): Hulk appears in the series and is voiced by Armen Taylor. Although in this series he has a friendlier personality.

Live-action

1970s 

Hulk appeared in the 1978–1982 live action television series, The Incredible Hulk, and its subsequent television films. Created by Universal Studios, it starred Bill Bixby as Dr. David Banner and Lou Ferrigno as Hulk. It does not follow the comic book-fantasy format, omits the typical villains or supporting characters, and Hulk does not speak, but only growls and roars. In this series, David Banner becomes Hulk, is assumed dead and goes on the run while being pursued by tabloid investigative reporter Jack McGee (Jack Colvin) who is bent on proving that the creature exists. The two-hour pilot movie, which established the Hulk's origins, aired on November 4, 1977. The series was originally broadcast by CBS from March 10, 1978 to June 2, 1982, with eighty-two episodes in five seasons, and later followed by three television films.

Bill Bixby / Lou Ferrigno TV films (1977-1990) 
The Incredible Hulk (1977) - Pilot for the CBS series, written and directed by Kenneth Johnson (distributed in theaters in some countries).
The Return of the Incredible Hulk (1977) - Pilot sequel directed by Alan J. Levi (also shown overseas as a feature film); retitled "Death in the Family" as a two-parter in syndication.
Married (1978) - Two-hour season-two premiere episode directed by Kenneth Johnson (theatrically released outside of the United States as Hulk Returns or The Bride of the Incredible Hulk).
The Incredible Hulk Returns (1988) - NBC resurrection of the characters from the series by Lou Ferrigno and Bill Bixby, with the addition of Eric Allan Kramer as the Asgardian Thor; directed by Nicholas Corea.
The Trial of the Incredible Hulk (1989) - Sequel directed by Bill Bixby, with Rex Smith as Matt Murdock/Daredevil and John Rhys-Davies as Wilson Fisk/Kingpin. This film marks the first time Stan Lee appeared in a Marvel movie.
The Death of the Incredible Hulk (1990) - Again directed by Bixby, this is the final installment of the television live-action franchise.

Theatrical films

Hulk (2003)

Hulk explores the origins of the Hulk, which is partially attributed to David Banner's immune system experiments on himself, and on his son as well as Bruce's nano-med gamma research. The film stars Eric Bana as Dr. Bruce Banner, as well as Jennifer Connelly, Sam Elliott, Josh Lucas, and Nick Nolte with Ang Lee directing the film. The film is produced and distributed by Universal Pictures.

Animation

 A depiction of the Ultimate Marvel version of Hulk has been featured in Ultimate Avengers: The Movie, an animated direct-to-video adaptation of the Ultimates produced by Marvel Entertainment and Lions Gate Films, with Michael Massee voicing Dr. Bruce Banner, and Fred Tatasciore voicing the Hulk. Based on the Ultimate Hulk, Bruce Banner is working on recreating the super soldier serum. Banner thinking that the serum could help him control the Hulk, and creates a cure with his own blood. After the fight with the Chitauri, the Hulk becomes out of control and is taken down by the Avengers. In the sequel, Ultimate Avengers 2: Rise of the Panther, Banner (voiced again by Massee) is in a prison cell due to what occurred in the first film. At the end the Hulk (voiced again by Tatasciore) breaks out of the cell and escapes.
 An elderly Hulk appears in the alternate universe Next Avengers: Heroes of Tomorrow, with Ken Kramer voicing Bruce Banner and Tatasciore reprises the role of the Hulk. He has decided to hide and keep away from other people for their own safety. The Young Avengers come up a plan to lure Ultron there so he can cause the Hulk to appear, destroying the robot. This plan worked as Torunn throws Ultron's body into space so that he can't pull himself back together.
 Tatasciore reprises his role of the Hulk in Hulk Vs., with Bryce Johnson voicing Bruce Banner. The film features the Hulk in the first two short films: Hulk Vs Wolverine and Hulk Vs Thor.
 In Planet Hulk, Rick D. Wasserman voices the Hulk. The film is based on the "Planet Hulk" storyline.
 The Hulk appears as a central character in Iron Man & Hulk: Heroes United. Tatasciore reprised his role as the Hulk.
 The Hulk appears in the anime film Avengers Confidential: Black Widow & Punisher with Tatasciore reprising the role.
 Hulk appears in Iron Man and Captain America: Heroes United, with Tatasciore reprising his role.
 Hulk appears in Hulk: Where Monsters Dwell with Bruce Banner voiced again by Jesse Burch and Hulk voiced again by Fred Tatasciore.  The film had its world premiere at the New York Comic Con on October 8, 2016 and was released on Digital HD On October 21, 2016. The synopsis for the 2016 film is: "Hulk, Doctor Strange and the Howling Commandos on a mission to stop Nightmare from conquering the world."
 Hulk appears in Lego Marvel Super Heroes - Black Panther: Trouble in Wakanda, with Tatasciore again reprising his role.

Marvel Cinematic Universe

 Edward Norton portrays Bruce Banner in The Incredible Hulk (2008), with Lou Ferrigno providing the voice of the Hulk. Norton did not return to the role in The Avengers (2012), and was replaced by Mark Ruffalo. Ruffalo reprises the role of Banner in Avengers: Age of Ultron (2015), Thor: Ragnarok (2017), Avengers: Infinity War, and Avengers: Endgame (2019). Additionally, Ruffalo makes various cameos appearances as Banner in post-credits scenes for three films: Iron Man 3 (2013), Captain Marvel (2019), and Shang-Chi and the Legend of the Ten Rings (2021) with the latter two featuring him in the mid-credits scene.
Marvel's Agents of S.H.I.E.L.D. (2013) Archival footage of Mark Ruffalo portrayal of the Hulk from The Avengers was used in the episode "Pilot".
Daredevil (2015): A framed newspaper clipping showing an image of the Edward Norton portrayal of the Hulk from The Incredible Hulk, accompanied by the headline "Hulk emerges victorious in destructive uptown battle" appears in the background of Ben Urich's office throughout several episodes of the series' first season. 
Mark Ruffalo reprised his role as Bruce Banner in the Marvel Cinematic Universe animated series, What If...?
 Ruffalo reprises his role as Bruce Banner / Hulk in the She-Hulk: Attorney at Law television series.

Comic strips
 The Hulk appeared in his own syndicated newspaper strip, named The Incredible Hulk which debuted on October 30, 1978 and ran until September 5, 1982 by King Features Syndicate.
 The Hulk has also appeared in the Amazing Spider-Man strip.

Fine arts 
Starting with the Pop Art period and on a continuing basis since the 1960s, many comic book characters, including Hulk, have been "appropriated" by multiple visual artists and incorporated into contemporary artwork, most notably by Andy Warhol, Roy Lichtenstein, Dulce Pinzon, Jeff Koons, and others.

Novels
Pocket Books published two mass market paperback solo novels starring the character, The Incredible Hulk: Stalker From the Stars in 1978 and The Incredible Hulk: Cry of the Beast in 1979. The Hulk has appeared in the following novels:

Video games

The Incredible Hulk has appeared in video games for many systems, including the Commodore 64, ZX Spectrum, Sega Genesis, SNES, Sega Master System, Game Gear, PlayStation, Sega Saturn, PlayStation 2, Xbox, GameCube, Game Boy Advance, and personal computer.

 The 1st Hulk video game was Questprobe featuring The Hulk, released by Adventure International in 1984 for the PC, Commodore 64, and ZX Spectrum. It was followed by The Incredible Hulk, The Incredible Hulk: The Pantheon Saga, Hulk (which was loosely based on the 2003 film rather than the comic books), and The Incredible Hulk for the Game Boy Advance
 The Hulk appears in The Incredible Hulk: Ultimate Destruction, with Neal McDonough reprising the role of Bruce Banner and Michael Donovan reprising Gray Hulk from the 1996 TV series, while Richard Moll voiced the Devil Hulk persona.
 In addition to his own games, the Hulk appears as a playable character in several games by Capcom. The first was a SNES game for the home consoles called Marvel Super Heroes: War of the Gems. After this the Hulk appeared in several arcade fighting games, starting with Marvel Super Heroes in 1995, followed by Marvel Super Heroes vs. Street Fighter, Marvel vs. Capcom: Clash of Super Heroes and concluding with Marvel vs. Capcom 2: New Age of Heroes. In all Capcom games until after Marvel vs. Capcom 2, Hulk's persona was that of his merger with Bruce Banner called Professor Hulk. In later games such as (Ultimate) Marvel vs. Capcom 3: Fate of Two Worlds  and  Marvel vs. Capcom: Infinite, Hulk return to his original persona, and voiced again by Fred Tatasciore.
 The Hulk has a cameo in the Fantastic Four video game for the PlayStation and Sega Saturn as a boss.
 The Hulk is the main character in the Hulk video game which picks up after the film of the same name from 2003 with Eric Bana voicing Bruce Banner and Graig Robertson voicing Hulk.
 The Hulk is in a cutscene in the Marvel Nemesis: Rise of the Imperfects game for the PS2, Xbox, and GameCube. Hulk is defeated and captured by the Imperfects along with Captain America and Punisher.
 In the Ultimate Spider-Man video game, Spider-Man makes a reference to the Hulk in his fight with the Green Goblin by saying that Green Goblin is "impressive" but not "Hulk-impressive".
 The Hulk appears in all of the Marvel: Ultimate Alliance games.
 In the first game, he first appeared as Bruce Banner (voiced by Robin Atkin Downes in most versions and by Arin Hanson in the Wii version) and later appeared as one of Doctor Doom's victim during a raid on Castle Doom with the other superheroes including the X-Men. In-game data shows that Hulk was originally meant to be a playable character in the roster, but rights issues prevented him from being added to the roster prior to release, such as having a special dialogue with Mandarin (while against Ultimo Mark II), Spider-Woman and Doctor Doom. The Hulk later became available as a downloadable character in the Xbox 360 version voiced by Peter Lurie. His alternate costumes are his original grey-skinned look, Joe Fixit, and Gladiator Hulk.
 The Hulk returns as a playable character in Marvel: Ultimate Alliance 2, voiced by Fred Tatasciore. Red Hulk serves as an alternate appearance for The Hulk.
 The Hulk returns as a playable character in Marvel Ultimate Alliance 3: The Black Order, voiced again by Fred Tatasciore.
 The Hulk is the main character in The Incredible Hulk video game with Edward Norton voicing Bruce Banner and Fred Tatasciore voicing the Hulk. In the game, there are secret characters/costumes you can unlock such as Joe Fixit, Gray Hulk, Classic Hulk, and much more.
 The Hulk appears in every Marvel Super Hero Squad video game series.
 The Hulk appears as a playable character in the Marvel Super Hero Squad, (which features his Grey Hulk persona and Red Hulk as his alternate appearances) as well as Marvel Super Hero Squad: Comic Combat. In both, games he was voiced by Travis Willingham.
 The Hulk appears as a playable character in Marvel Super Hero Squad: The Infinity Gauntlet, voiced again by Travis Willingham.
 The Hulk is a playable character in Marvel Super Hero Squad Online. He is seen in his standard torn pants attire, his Planet Hulk gladiator attire, Avengers movie attire, and SHIELD attire.
 Hulk 2099 has a cameo in Spider-Man: Shattered Dimensions, where he appears on one of the billboards in 2099.
 The Hulk is available as downloadable content for the game LittleBigPlanet, as part of "Marvel Costume Kit 4".
 The Hulk appeared in the first five virtual pinball games for Pinball FX 2 released by Zen Studios. The four games were a part of the Marvel Pinball: Avengers Chronicles. The games being World War Hulk, The Avengers, Infinity Gauntlet, and (as Nul, Breaker of Worlds) Fear Itself. As well as Avengers: Age of Ultron.
 The Hulk is a playable character in the Facebook game Marvel: Avengers Alliance. His alternate costumes include his Planet Hulk and Avengers costumes.
 The Hulk appears as a playable character in the 2012 fighting game Marvel Avengers: Battle for Earth.
 The Hulk is a playable character in the MMORPG Marvel Heroes voiced again by Fred Tatasciore.
 The Hulk is playable in every Lego Marvel series:
 The Hulk is one of the starting playable characters alongside Iron Man, and later Spider-Man in Lego Marvel Super Heroes, with Hulk and Bruce Banner voiced again by Fred Tatasciore.
 The Hulk appears in Lego Marvel's Avengers. His voice was provided by a combination of Mark Ruffalo's archive recordings and new recordings by Fred Tatasciore. In a mission held by A-Bomb, the players had to help him get a selfie with Hulk.
 The Hulk returns as a playable character in Lego Marvel Super Heroes 2, voiced by Gary Martin. The normal and Thor: Ragnarok versions of both Hulk and Bruce Banner are present alongside a Wild West version of Bruce Banner. When the heroes end up on the Sakarar section of Chronopolis, Red King unleashes the World Breakers which consist of Hulk, Red Hulk, Maestro, and Greenskyn Smashtroll on them. The players worked to free Hulk from the mind-control and he later assists in the fight against Kang the Conqueror.
 The Hulk's costume was available in Club Penguin during the Avengers edition of the game.
 The Hulk is a playable character in Marvel Avengers Alliance Tactics.
 The Hulk is a playable character in Marvel: Contest of Champions. His Joe Fixit form appears as a separate playable character, as well as his Maestro form being a major unplayable character.
 The Hulk appears as a playable character in two last Disney Infinity games, Disney Infinity: Marvel Super Heroes and Disney Infinity 3.0 reprised by Fred Tatasciore.
 Triple H voiced The Hulk in The Marvel Experience.
 The Hulk is a playable character in Marvel: Future Fight.
 The Hulk has many playable versions in Marvel Puzzle Quest, with the latest, in March 2020, being inspired by the incarnation seen in Immortal Hulk.
 A teenage version of Hulk appears as a playable character in Marvel Avengers Academy, voiced by wrestler and actor John Cena. Bruce Banner also appears in the game, voiced by Kellen Goff.
 The Hulk is a playable character in Marvel Powers United VR, voiced again by Fred Tatasciore.
 The Hulk appears in Marvel Battle Lines, voiced again by Fred Tatasciore.
 The Hulk appears in Marvel Dimension of Heroes, voiced again by Fred Tatasciore.
 The Hulk appears in Avengers, with Troy Baker voicing Dr. Bruce Banner and Darin De Paul voicing the Hulk.
 The Hulk appears in Marvel Future Revolution, with Fred Tatasciore reprising his voice role from various Marvel media.
 The Hulk appears as a playable character and a major antagonist in Marvel's Midnight Suns, with William Salyers voicing Bruce Banner and Fred Tatasciore reprising his role as the Hulk from various Marvel media. Due to the gamma energy of the Midnight Sun's magic, Bruce is unable to Hulk out, leaving him in a state akin to being pent up. Bruce is enthralled shortly afterwards by Lilith, which is being used to replace Faustus. He later breaks through his Hulk block by jumping into the blast of Stark's gamma gun, turning into Smart Hulk.

Podcasts
An Old Man Logan version of Hulk appears in Marvel's Wastelanders, voiced by Blake Morris in "Star-Lord" segment and by Danny Burstein in the "Doom" segment.

Live performances
 The Hulk was one of the superheroes portrayed in the 1987 live adaptation of the Spider-Man and Mary Jane Watson's wedding performed at Shea Stadium.
 The Hulk appears in the Marvel Universe Live! stage show.

Popular culture references

1979 to 2019: Saturday Night Live
season 4, episode 15 sketch called "Superhero Party" has John Belushi playing the Hulk when Superman (Bill Murray) and Lois Lane (Margot Kidder) are married and having a dinner party.
season 18, episode 8 sketch called "Superman's Funeral", where the Hulk (portrayed by Chris Farley) is one of the speakers.
season 20, episode 9 sketch called "The Incredible Hulk", where the Hulk (portrayed by George Foreman) gets bored at a needlessly repetitive sketch.
season 40, episode 16 sketch called "The Rock Obama", where the Hulk (portrayed by Dwayne Johnson) is called the Rock Obama.
season 44, episode 15 sketch called "The Impossible Hulk", where Dr. Banner (portrayed by Idris Elba) transforms into a raging white woman (portrayed by Cecily Strong) due to a "failed gamma ray experiment" above a Tory Burch.
1990: Attack of the Killer Tomatoes episode – "Tomato from the Black Lagoon", Chad Finletter sees a man getting angry and impatient while waiting for a plane, then the man starts to turn into a green muscular monster as he gets angry.
1991: Taz-Mania – episode "Dr. Wendal and Mr. Taz", Wendal is irradiated in an "Ultra gamma ray testing booth", mistaking it for a tanning booth, causing him to transform into a giant, violent monster whenever he is made upset.
1996: Adventures of Ricardo short – originally seen on MTV's Cartoon Sushi and available on The Animation Show DVD, the title character professes his love of the character, renamed "The Incwedibul Hunk" here due to Ricardo's speech impediment
1996: Dexter's Laboratory – a purple-skinned parody of the Hulk named "The Infraggable Krunk" (voiced by Frank Welker) made a few appearances in season one and shared a segment called "The Justice Friends" with Major Glory (a parody of Captain America voiced by Rob Paulsen) and Valhallen (a parody of Thor voiced by Tom Kenny). Additionally, the episode "Hunger Strikes" has Dexter transform into a Hulk-like monster whenever he doesn't eat vegetables, complete with a parody of the "You wouldn't like me when I'm angry" line.
1998, 2004: MADtv
season 3, episode 17 skit showed a man (portrayed by Will Sasso) becoming a miniature version of the Hulk (portrayed by Alex Borstein), and a
season 9, episode 19 skit has Bruce Banner (portrayed by Ike Barinholtz) attempt to create a serum that will prevent him from becoming the Hulk. The serum, however, backfires and causes him to turn into a homosexual pink colored version of the Hulk (portrayed by Paul C. Vogt).
1999–2011: Family Guy 
episode "Chitty Chitty Death Bang" (1999), a part in Peter Griffin's obviously made-up story to Lois Griffin has him turning into the Hulk to attack the devilish manager of the place he is supposed to have Stewie's birthday
The end credits for the episode "Wasted Talent" (2000) are run while Joe Harnell's "The Lonely Man" plays in homage to The Incredible Hulk (1978 TV series); it shows Stewie hitchhiking along the side of the freeway á la David Banner
episode "A Fish out of Water" (2001), Peter buys a fishing boat and gives it the name of "S.S. More Powerful Than Superman, Batman, Spider-Man, and The Incredible Hulk put it together"
episode "Emission Impossible" (2001), Peter asks Lois's sister if he can have her husband's shirts so that he can imitate Hulk ripping his shirt off throughout; And the 2011
episode: "And I'm Joyce Kinney", replaces the regular Family Guy opening with a spoof of the Hulk TV series opening, placing Stewie as David Banner, Peter as the Hulk and Tom Tucker as Jack McGee
2001 (Dr. Dre album): On the song "Some L.A. Niggas," rapper King T compares the marijuana he smokes to the Hulk, with the line, "Smoke big green, call it Bruce Banner"
2002: Scrubs – episode "My Student", after the medical student assigned to J.D. made numerous mistakes, J.D. gets angry and transforms into the Hulk
2002/08: The Simpsons
episode "Sex, Pies and Idiot Scrapes", a Hulk-parody character, called the "Mulk", is shown fighting another ingenious Marvel parody, "The Thung"
episode "I Am Furious (Yellow)", Homer turns into the Hulk
2005–13: The character appears in the Robot Chicken episodes: "The Deep End" (2005), "Badunkadunk" (2005), "Two Weeks Without Food" (2009), "Executed by the State" (2012), "Collateral Damage in Gang Turf War" (2012), "Eaten by Cats" (2013)
2006: The Fast and the Furious: Tokyo Drift – Lil' Bow Wow has a Hulk-themed car.
2007: The Hulk appears in the South Park episode trilogy "Imaginationland"
2008: In the parody film Disaster Movie, the character is played by Roland Kickinger
2010: Castle – episode "Tick, Tick, Tick...", Martha Rodgers (played by Susan Sullivan) watches a video of the pilot episode of The Incredible Hulk, where she plays Dr. Marks
2016: Bruce Banner (portrayed by Lloyd Ahlquist) and The Hulk (portrayed by Mike O'Hearn) appear in an episode of Epic Rap Battles of History, rap battling against Bruce and Caitlyn Jenner respectively. He also appeared in the 69th episode of the popular online show from ScrewAttack, Death Battle, where he fought Doomsday from DC Comics in a hypothetical battle to the death and lost. He also fought and lost against Broly from Dragon Ball Z in a One Minute Melee, then later fought the Dragon Ball Super version of Broly in a Death Battle and again lost.
2018: The Hulk appeared in the 47th episode of DBX, a spin-off of Death Battle, in which he defeated the Juggernaut.
Several Twitter accounts exist that parody the Hulk, including Feminist Hulk, Drunk Hulk, and Film Crit Hulk.

References

Hulk (comics)